This article is a summary of common equations and quantities in thermodynamics (see thermodynamic equations for more elaboration).

Definitions

Many of the definitions below are also used in the thermodynamics of chemical reactions.

General basic quantities

General derived quantities

Thermal properties of matter

Thermal transfer

Equations

The equations in this article are classified by subject.

Thermodynamic processes

Kinetic theory

Ideal gas

Entropy

, where kB is the Boltzmann constant, and Ω denotes the volume of macrostate in the phase space or otherwise called thermodynamic probability.
, for reversible processes only

Statistical physics

Below are useful results from the Maxwell–Boltzmann distribution for an ideal gas, and the implications of the Entropy quantity. The distribution is valid for atoms or molecules constituting ideal gases.

Corollaries of the non-relativistic Maxwell–Boltzmann distribution are below.

Quasi-static and reversible processes

For quasi-static and reversible processes, the first law of thermodynamics is:

where δQ is the heat supplied to the system and δW is the work done by the system.

Thermodynamic potentials

The following energies are called the thermodynamic potentials,

and the corresponding fundamental thermodynamic relations or "master equations" are:

Maxwell's relations

The four most common Maxwell's relations are:

More relations include the following.

Other differential equations are:

Quantum properties

  Indistinguishable Particles

where N is number of particles, h is Planck's constant, I is moment of inertia, and Z is the partition function, in various forms:

Thermal properties of matter

Thermal transfer

Thermal efficiencies

See also

Antoine equation
Bejan number
Bowen ratio
Bridgman's equations
Clausius–Clapeyron relation
Departure functions
Duhem–Margules equation
Ehrenfest equations
Gibbs–Helmholtz equation
Phase rule
Kopp's law
Noro–Frenkel law of corresponding states
Onsager reciprocal relations
Stefan number
Triple product rule
Exact differential

References

 Atkins, Peter and de Paula, Julio  Physical Chemistry, 7th edition, W.H. Freeman and Company, 2002 .
 Chapters 1–10, Part 1: "Equilibrium".
 
Landsberg, Peter T.  Thermodynamics and Statistical Mechanics. New York: Dover Publications, Inc., 1990. (reprinted from Oxford University Press, 1978).
 Lewis, G.N., and Randall, M., "Thermodynamics", 2nd Edition, McGraw-Hill Book Company, New York, 1961.
 Reichl, L.E., A Modern Course in Statistical Physics, 2nd edition, New York: John Wiley & Sons, 1998.
Schroeder, Daniel V. Thermal Physics.  San Francisco: Addison Wesley Longman, 2000 .
Silbey, Robert J., et al. Physical Chemistry, 4th ed. New Jersey: Wiley, 2004.
Callen, Herbert B. (1985). Thermodynamics and an Introduction to Themostatistics, 2nd edition, New York: John Wiley & Sons.

External links
Thermodynamic equation calculator

Thermodynamic equations